The 2014 Tim Hortons Brier was held from March 1 to 9 at the Interior Savings Centre in Kamloops, British Columbia.

Unlike previous years, the winner of this year's Brier will now automatically qualify for the 2015 Brier as Team Canada, similarly to the Scotties Tournament of Hearts.

Teams
The teams are listed as follows:

Round-robin standings
Final round-robin standings

Relegation
Two member associations will be relegated to a pre-qualifier tournament at the beginning of the 2015 Tim Hortons Brier. The two teams with the lowest combined record from the previous three years will join the Yukon and Nunavut in the 2015 qualifying round with one team advancing to the Brier round robin.

Record from previous three Briers
Record is from round robin games only.

Round-robin results
All draw times are listed in Pacific Time.

Draw 1
Saturday, March 1, 1:30 pm

Draw 2
Saturday, March 1, 6:30 pm

Draw 3
Sunday, March 2, 8:30 am

Draw 4
Sunday, March 2, 1:30 pm

Draw 5
Sunday, March 2, 6:30 pm

Draw 6
Monday, March 3, 1:30 pm

Draw 7
Monday, March 3, 6:30 pm

Draw 8
Tuesday, March 4, 8:30 am

Draw 9
Tuesday, March 4, 1:30 pm

Draw 10
Tuesday, March 4, 6:30 pm

Draw 11
Wednesday, March 5, 8:00 am

Draw 12
Wednesday, March 5, 1:00 pm

Draw 13
Wednesday, March 5, 6:30 pm

Draw 14
Thursday, March 6, 8:30 am

Draw 15
Thursday, March 6, 1:30 pm

Draw 16
Thursday, March 6, 6:30 pm

Draw 17
Friday, March 7, 8:30 am

Playoffs

1 vs. 2
Friday, March 7, 6:30 pm

3 vs. 4
Saturday, March 8, 1:30 pm

Semifinal
Saturday, March 8, 6:30 pm

Bronze medal game
Sunday, March 9, 9:00 am

Final
Sunday, March 9, 4:30 pm

Statistics

Top 5 player percentages
Round robin only

Perfect games

Awards
The awards and all-star teams are listed as follows:

All-Star Teams
First Team
Fourth:  Jim Cotter, British Columbia
Third:  John Morris, British Columbia
Second:  Mark Nichols, Manitoba
Lead:  Rick Sawatsky, British Columbia

Second Team
Skip:  Kevin Koe, Alberta
Third:  Pat Simmons, Alberta
Second:  Tyrel Griffith, British Columbia
Lead:  Philippe Ménard, Quebec

Ross Harstone Sportsmanship Award
 Greg Balsdon, Ontario skip

Scotty Harper Award
Bob Weeks, Ontario Curling Report, for his tribute to Shorty Jenkins

Paul McLean Award
Andy Bouyoukos, director of TSN's curling broadcasts

Hec Gervais Most Valuable Player Award
 Carter Rycroft, Alberta second

References

External links

 
Sport in Kamloops
Curling in British Columbia
The Brier
Tim Hortons Brier
Tim Hortons Brier
Tim Hortons Brier